Alimzhon Kyashafovich Rafikov (born 30 April 1962) is a Tajikistani professional football coach and a former player.

Club career
He made his professional debut in the Soviet Second League in 1983 for FC Pakhtakor Kurgan-Tyube.

Coaching career
He is currently the manager of Esteghlal Dushanbe.

Personal life
His son Ruslan Rafikov is a professional footballer.

Honours
 USSR Federation Cup winner: 1988.

References

1962 births
Living people
Sportspeople from Dushanbe
Soviet footballers
Tajikistani footballers
Tajikistani expatriate footballers
Tajikistani football managers
Soviet Top League players
Russian Premier League players
FC Kairat players
CSKA Pamir Dushanbe players
FC Zenit Saint Petersburg players
Expatriate footballers in Kazakhstan
Expatriate footballers in Russia
FC KAMAZ Naberezhnye Chelny players
Tajikistani expatriate sportspeople in Kazakhstan
Tajikistani expatriate sportspeople in Russia
Vakhsh Qurghonteppa players
Tajikistan national football team managers
Association football defenders
FC Neftekhimik Nizhnekamsk players